Tiffany Lisa Cohen (born June 11, 1966) is an American former swimmer who was a double gold medalist at the 1984 Summer Olympics (400-meter and 800-meter freestyle).

Cohen is Jewish.

In 1982, she won the U.S. National Championship in the 500-, 1,000-, and 1650-yard freestyle, and finished third in the 400-meter freestyle at the FINA World Aquatics Championships.

In the 1986 championships, Cohen won the 400- and 800-meter freestyles and the 200-meter butterfly. She retired in 1987,  after finishing second to Janet Evans in the 400- and 800-meter races at the 1987 national outdoor meet.

She was inducted into the International Swimming Hall of Fame as an "Honor Swimmer" in 1996.

See also
 List of members of the International Swimming Hall of Fame
 List of Olympic medalists in swimming (women)
 List of select Jewish swimmers
 List of University of Texas at Austin alumni
 List of World Aquatics Championships medalists in swimming (women)

References

External links
  Tiffany Cohen – Jewish athlete profile at JewsInSports.org
 
 

1966 births
Living people
American female butterfly swimmers
American female freestyle swimmers
Jewish American sportspeople
Jewish swimmers
Olympic gold medalists for the United States in swimming
Pan American Games gold medalists for the United States
Swimmers at the 1983 Pan American Games
Swimmers at the 1984 Summer Olympics
Texas Longhorns women's swimmers
World Aquatics Championships medalists in swimming
Medalists at the 1984 Summer Olympics
Pan American Games medalists in swimming
Medalists at the 1983 Pan American Games
21st-century American Jews
21st-century American women